Donaldo Ortiz Colín (born 18 May 1961) is a Mexican politician from the Party of the Democratic Revolution. From 2001 to 2003 he served as Deputy of the LVIII Legislature of the Mexican Congress representing Michoacán.

References

1961 births
Living people
Politicians from Michoacán
People from Zitácuaro
Party of the Democratic Revolution politicians
21st-century Mexican politicians
Deputies of the LVIII Legislature of Mexico
Members of the Chamber of Deputies (Mexico) for Michoacán